The Palais de la Bourse is a building on the Canebière in Marseille, France. It houses the Chambre de commerce et d'industrie Marseille-Provence, as well as the Musée de la Marine et de l'Économie de Marseille.

See also
 List of works by Eugène Guillaume

1st arrondissement of Marseille
Buildings and structures in Marseille